Hidden Valley (formerly, Union House) is an unincorporated community in Placer County, California. It lies at an elevation of 436 feet (133 m).

References

Unincorporated communities in California
Unincorporated communities in Placer County, California